Tecmar is a monotypic genus of planthopper in the family Fulgoridae, presently comprising a single species Tecmar pausanias, known from South Africa.

References

Auchenorrhyncha genera
Fulgoridae
Monotypic Hemiptera genera
Insects of Africa